H. J. Huck & Co. was a lumberyard and construction contracting company in Texas.

The company was founded in 1846 at Indianola, Texas, by German immigrant Henry Joseph Huck (August 3, 1822 – December 18, 1905). He reportedly became "the leading lumbeman and supplier of building materials in the young State of Texas." Huck was also elected first judge of Calhoun County, Texas, and a member of the Indianola Guards. The business was destroyed during the American Civil War, and Huck joined the Confederate Army. Huck resumed business after the war and opened branches in Cuero, Texas, and Victoria, Texas. The business suffered damage in the Gulf Coast hurricanes of 1866 and 1875. He moved the headquarters of the business to Cuero after the 1886 Indianola hurricane destroyed the city, including Huck's business. The Huck Slough Bridge at the south end of Mount Bonnell Road north of Austin, Texas, is named for Judge H. J. Huck's family.

In 1907, the company became known as the Cuero Lumber Co., and eventually became the Alamo Lumber Co..

A number of its works are listed on the National Register of Historic Places.

Works include:
Bates-Sheppard House, now the DeWitt County Museum, 312 E. Broadway, Cuero, Texas (Huck, H. J.,& Co.), NRHP-listed
Billow-Thompson House, 402 E. Broadway, Cuero, Texas (Huck, H. J.,& Co.), NRHP-listed
Callaway-Gillette House, 306 E. Sarah, Cuero, Texas (Huck, H. J., & Co.), NRHP-listed
Colston-Gohmert House, 309 E. Prairie, Cuero, Texas (Huck, H. J., & Co.), NRHP-listed
W. H. Crain House, 508 E. Courthouse, Cuero, Texas (Huck, H. J., & Co.), NRHP-listed
William and L. F. Eichholz House, 308 E. Courthouse, Cuero, Texas (Huck, H. J.,& Co.), NRHP-listed
Albert and Kate Leinhardt House, 818 E. Morgan, Cuero, Texas (Huck,H. J., & Co.), NRHP-listed
Meissner-Pleasants House, 108 N. Hunt, Cuero, Texas (Huck, H. J., & Co.), NRHP-listed
S. I. Ott House, 302 N. Hunt, Cuero, Texas (Huck, H. J., & Co.), NRHP-listed

See also
Hensley-Gusman House, 2120 Sixth St., Bay City, Texas (Alamo Lumber Co.), NRHP-listed
Mueller Bridge, CR 337 over Cibolo Cr., La Vernia, Texas (Alamo Construction Co.), NRHP-listed

References

Construction and civil engineering companies of the United States